Nong Khai Province Stadium is a multi-purpose stadium in Nong Khai province , Thailand.  It is currently used mostly for football matches and is the home stadium of Nong Khai F.C.

Multi-purpose stadiums in Thailand
Buildings and structures in Nong Khai province
Sport in Nong Khai province